Ammonium fumarate is a compound with formula (NH4)2(C2H2(COO)2). It is the ammonium salt of fumaric acid.  As a food additive, it has the E number E368.

Fumarates
Ammonium compounds
Food additives